The South Yorkshire Joint Secretariat (SYJS) is a body established to provide support to the four joint authorities that were formed in South Yorkshire following the abolition of the South Yorkshire County Council in 1986. When the county council was abolished, joint-boards were established to manage policing, fire and rescue services, integrated transport and pensions on a county wide basis.

The four authorities supported by the joint secretariat are:

Sheffield City Region Combined Authority
South Yorkshire Fire and Rescue Authority
South Yorkshire Passenger Transport Executive
South Yorkshire Pensions Authority
South Yorkshire Police and Crime Commissioner

The metropolitan county of South Yorkshire consists of four metropolitan districts; the City of Sheffield, the City of Doncaster, the Metropolitan Borough of Rotherham and the Metropolitan Borough of Barnsley which function as de facto unitary authorities.

External links
Official website of the South Yorkshire Joint Secretariat

Local government in South Yorkshire
Organisations based in South Yorkshire
1986 establishments in England